Nežilovo is a village in the municipality of Čaška, North Macedonia. It used to be part of the former municipality of Bogomila.

Demographics
On the 1927 ethnic map of Leonhard Schulze-Jena, the village is shown as a Serbianized Bulgarian Christian village. According to the 2021 census, the village had a total of 33 inhabitants. Ethnic groups in the village include:

Macedonians 30
Others 3

References

Villages in Čaška Municipality